Richard Lavender was an English priest in the late 15th and early 16th centuries.

Lavender was educated at Winchester College and New College, Oxford. He was Archdeacon of Leicester from 1485 until his death in 1508.

Notes 

Archdeacons of Leicester
15th-century English clergy
15th-century births
Year of birth uncertain
1508 deaths
16th-century English clergy
Alumni of New College, Oxford
People educated at Winchester College